Adrián Mora Barraza (born 15 August 1997) is a Mexican professional footballer who plays as a centre-back for Liga MX club Juárez.

Club career

Toluca
Mora joined Deportivo Toluca for the Apertura 2018 tournament from the team's Youth System. He made his professional debut on 5 September 2019 in a Copa MX match against Tijuana, where he also scored his first professional career goal.

On 14 September 2018, Mora made his league debut for Toluca against Veracruz. On that same match, he scored the first goal of his Liga MX career.

Mora was signed by Tigres UANL for the Apertura 2019 tournament, but on 27 June 2019 he was bought back by Toluca after the team paid 2 million dollars for the player.

International career
Mora was part of the under-22 squad that competed at the 2019 Toulon Tournament, where Mexico finished in third in the tournament.

Mora was called up to participate in the 2020 Summer Olympics, replacing José Juan Macías who withdrew due to injury. He won the bronze medal with the Olympic team.

Career statistics

Club

Honours
Mexico U23
Olympic Bronze Medal: 2020

References

External links
 
 
 

1997 births
Living people
Liga MX players
Deportivo Toluca F.C. players
Association football defenders
Olympic footballers of Mexico
Olympic medalists in football
Olympic bronze medalists for Mexico
Footballers at the 2020 Summer Olympics
Medalists at the 2020 Summer Olympics
People from Parral, Chihuahua
Footballers from Chihuahua
Mexican footballers